General Guise may refer to:

John Guise (British Army officer) (1683–1765), British Army lieutenant general
John Christopher Guise (1826–1895), British Army lieutenant general
John Wright Guise (1777–1865), British Army general

See also
Samuel Guise-Moores (1863–1942), British Army major general